Sam Walters MBE (born 11 October 1939) is a British theatre director who retired in 2014 as artistic director of the Orange Tree Theatre in Richmond, London. He has also directed in the West End and at Ipswich, Canterbury and Greenwich, as well as at LAMDA, RADA and Webber Douglas. After 42 years Walters, the United Kingdom's longest-serving artistic director, and his wife and associate director, Auriol Smith, stepped down from their posts at the Orange Tree Theatre in June 2014.

Career

Early years
Sam Walters was educated at Felsted School and while there, in 1957, he won the Public Schools Debating Association public speaking competition. He also captained the Essex Young Amateurs cricket team. He then took a degree at Merton College, Oxford (1959–62), where he was president of the Experimental Theatre Club. He trained as an actor at LAMDA (1962–64) turning to directing with the formation of the Worcester Repertory Company in 1967.

The Orange Tree Theatre
He was invited to establish Jamaica's first full-time theatre company and drama school, and on his return to England in 1971 he founded the Orange Tree Theatre, first in a room above the Orange Tree pub and then in a purpose-built theatre, in a converted former school. The Orange Tree was London's first purpose-built Theatre in the Round.

"When we started the Orange Tree Theatre in 1971, we only wanted to put on plays. There was no political or social aim, nor did we philosophise about theatre-in-the-round or a style of minimal theatre. There was no money for stage lights or a raised stage, so we performed by daylight on the same floor level as the seating. And we discovered the excitement of making the audience part of the action." (Sam Walters in conversation with Marsha Hanlon for the Orange Tree Theatre appeal brochure in 1991).

Walters won a Time Out Award for his 1987–88 season in the old theatre, being described as a "theatrical totter", and in 1989 was awarded a Winston Churchill Travelling Fellowship, part of which he spent in Prague during the Velvet Revolution, and part in Moscow and Leningrad.

In 1991 he received the Charrington Fringe Award for Outstanding Achievement in Small Theatre, which was followed by the Empty Space Peter Brook award for the work of the 1992–93 company season.

In 1993–94 he took a year away from the Orange Tree, taught in America and visited all fellow theatres-in-the-round.
In 2012 he was awarded a Special Achievement Award at the Off West End Theatre Awards.
In 2009 he was made an Honorary Doctor of Letters by Kingston University.
He received a Peter Brook Special Achievement Award at the 2013 Empty Space Peter Brook awards.

Honours

He was appointed MBE in 1999. He and his wife Auriol Smith received the Freedom of the London Borough of Richmond upon Thames in December 2014.

Productions
Sam Walters' productions at the Orange Tree Theatre include:

Old Orange Tree Theatre
Go Tell It on Table Mountain (Evan Jones), the Orange Tree's opening production on 31 December 1971
Games and After Liverpool (James Saunders) 1972
George Reborn (David Cregan) 1973
The Borage Pigeon Affair (James Saunders) 1973
Bye Bye Blues (James Saunders) 1973
Transcending (David Cregan)
Next Time I'll Sing to You (James Saunders) 1974
Tina (David Cregan) 1975
Transcending (David Cregan), February 1976
The Memorandum (Václav Havel), February 1977
Bodies (James Saunders), April 1977
Find Me (Olwen Wymark) 1977
Cast Off (David Cregan) 1978)
Mr Director (Fay weldon) 1978
Family Circles (Alan Ayckbourn), November 1978
The Caucasian Chalk Circle (Bertolt Brecht), January 1979
Doctor Knock (Jules Romains/Harley Granville Barker), March 1979
The Primary English Class (Israel Horovitz), November 1979
The Way of the World (Congreve), February 1980
The Happy Haven (John Arden), March 1980
Uncle Vanya (Chekhov), February 1981
Best Friends (Olwen Wymark), March 1981
Fall (James Saunders), November 1981
King Lear (Shakespeare,) January 1982
Winter (David Mowat), September 1983
Nothing to Declare (James Saunders), November 1983
The Man of Mode (Etherege), January 1984
The Power of Darkness (Tolstoy/Anthony Clark), March 1984
Four Attempted Acts (Martin Crimp), 1984
The Dark River (Rodney Ackland), September 1984
Hard Times (Charles Dickens/Stephen Jeffreys), November 1984
Hamlet: First Quarto version (Shakespeare), March 1985
Revisiting the Alchemist (Charles Jennings), October 1985
A Variety of Death-Defying Acts (Martin Crimp),December 1985
A Journey to London (Vanbrugh/James Saunders), January 1986
Sauce for the Goose (Le Dindon, Georges Feydeau,) February 1986
Mother Courage (Bertolt Brecht), October 1986
Hans Kohlhaas (Heinrich von Kleist/James Saunders), November 1986
Largo Desolato (Václav Havel/Tom Stoppard), February 1987
A Smile on the End of the Line (Michel Vinaver), March 1987
No More A-Roving (John Whiting), October 1987
Love's a Luxury (farce Guy Paxton and Edward V Hoile), December 1987
The Secret Life (Harley Granville Barker), January 1988
Absolute Hell (Rodney Ackland), March 1988
The Way to Keep Him (Arthur Murphy), September 1988
Dealing with Clair (Martin Crimp), October 1988
Situation Vacant (Michel Vinaver), March 1989
Le Bourgeois Gentilhomme (Molière), April 1989
Play with Repeats (Martin Crimp), October 1989
We, the Undersigned (Alexander Gelman), November 1989
Redevelopment (Václav Havel), September 1990

New Orange Tree Theatre
All in the Wrong (Arthur Murphy), opening production in the new theatre, February 1991
Nutmeg and Ginger (Julian Slade), June 1991
Little Eyolf (Henrik Ibsen), October 1991
Cerceau (Viktor Slavkin), Walters as a performer only, May 1992
Dark River revival (Rodney Ackland), March 1992
His Majesty (Harley Granville Barker) also Edinburgh Festival, September 1992
The Dutch Courtesan (John Marston) October 1992
A Penny for a Song (John Whiting), December 1992
The Artifice (Susannah Centlivre), February 1993
Nice Dorothy (David Cregan), May 1993
A Penny for a Song (John Whiting) revival, July 1993
Doctor Knock (Jules Romains) revival, October 1994
Flora the Red Menace (Kander and Ebb), December 1994
Portrait of a Woman (Michael Vinaver, translated by Donald Watson), February 1995
The Memorandum (Václav Havel), March 1995
Retreat (James Saunders), May 1995
Flora the Red Menace (Kander and Ebb) revival, August 1995
The Maitlands (Ronald Mackenzie), October 1995
The Simpleton of the Unexpected Isles (George Bernard Shaw), December 1995
The Good Woman of Setzuan (Bertolt Brecht), February 1996
The Power of the Dog (Ellen Dryden), May 1996
What the Heart Feels (Stephen Bill), October 1996
Family Circles (Alan Ayckbourn), December 1996
Inheritors (Susan Glaspell), February 1997
Family Circles (Alan Ayckbourn), August 1997
Overboard (Michel Vinaver), October 1997
All in the Wrong (Arthur Murphy), revival December 1997
Macbeth (Shakespeare), February 1998
Sperm Wars (David Lewis), September 1998
Court in the Act (farce Hennequin and Veber), December 1998
The Way of the World (Congreve), March 1999
The Last Thrash (David Cregan), Walters as a performer only, April 1999
Winner Takes All (farce La main passe Feydau), January 2000
Hurting (David Lewis), March 2000
Arms and the Man (George Bernard Shaw), September 2000
The Daughter-in-Law (D. H. Lawrence), February 2001
Clockwatching (Torben Betts), March 2001
Whispers Along the Patio (David Cregan) October 2001, also Stephen Joseph Theatre, Scarborough
The Caucasian Chalk Circle (Bertolt Brecht, with a new Prologue by James Saunders), November 2001
Have You Anything to Declare? (farce Hennequin and Veber), December 2001
Three Sisters (Chekhov, translated by Carol Rocamora as The Three Sisters), February 2002
Happy Birthday Dear Alice (Bernard Farrell), April 2002
The Road to Ruin (Thomas Holcroft), September 2002
Saints Day (John Whiting), October 2002
The Game Hunter(Monsieur Chasse farce, Feydeau, translated by Richard Cottrell), April 2003
The Mob (John Galsworthy), September 2003
King Cromwell (Oliver Ford Davies), November 2003
Love's a Luxury (farce by Guy Paxton and Edward V Hoile), April 2004
The Marrying of Ann Leete (Harvey Granville Barker), September 2004
Myth, Propaganda & Disaster in Nazi Germany & Contemporary America (Stephen Sewell), November 2004
Monkey's Uncle (David Lewis), October 2005
A Journey to London (Vanbrugh, completed by James Saunders), December 2005
The Madras House (Harley Granville Barker), September 2006
Major Barbara (George Bernard Shaw), October 2006
The Skin Game (John Galsworthy), March 2007
The Woman Hater (Fanny Burney); December 2007
Leaving (Václav Havel), English language premiere, September 2008
Greenwash (David Lewis), February 2009
Factors Unforeseen (Michel Vinaver, translated by Catherine Crimp), May 2009
The Making of Moo (Nigel Dennis), November 2009
The Lady or the Tiger (Michael Richmond and Jeremy Paul, score by Nola York), January 2010
Once Bitten (farce by Alfred Hennequin and Alfred Dellacourt, translated and adapted by Reggie Oliver), January 2011
Reading Hebron (Jason Sherman), February 2011
The Conspirators (Václav Havel), August 2011
Muswell Hill (Torben Betts), February 2012
Yours for the Asking (Ana Diosdado), September 2012
Sauce for the Goose (Georges Feydeau), December 2012
The Stepmother (Githa Sowerby), February 2013
Springs Eternal (Susan Glaspell), September 2013

Personal life
Sam Walters is married to actress-director Auriol Smith, whom he met while doing pantomime at Rotherham in 1962. They have two daughters: Dorcas Walters, who was principal dancer with Birmingham Royal Ballet and now works in arts administration, and Octavia Walters, formerly an actress, now a sports injury masseur.

References

Sources
Who's Who in the Theatre, 17th edition, Volume 2: Playbills, ed Ian Herbert, Gale (1981) 
Theatre Record and its annual Indexes
Orange Tree Theatre appeals brochure 1991
Sam Walters' CVs in Orange Tree programmes

External links
 Orange Tree Theatre website
 Orange Tree history

1939 births
Living people
Alumni of Merton College, Oxford
English theatre directors
Members of the Order of the British Empire
People educated at Felsted School
People associated with Kingston University